Guillaume Cammas (1688–1777) was a  French painter and architect.

Life
Cammas was born in Aignes, Haute-Garonne, Midi-Pyrénées.  He studied under the painter Antoine Rivalz, and designed the façade of the Capitole de Toulouse, built between 1750 and 1759. He was one of the founders of Académie royale de peinture de Toulouse, where he taught. His son François-Lambert Cammas designed the transept of the église Saint-Pierre des Chartreux de Toulouse.

References
 MESURET, Robert,Les expositions de l'Académie Royale de Toulouse de 1751 à 1791, Espie, Paris, 1972.

1688 births
1777 deaths
18th-century French painters
French male painters
18th-century French architects
18th-century French male artists